1918 is a year in the Gregorian calendar.

1918 may also refer to:

 1918 (1957 film), a Finnish war film
 1918 (1985 film), an American drama film
 1918 (number)